Drakkar Entertainment GmbH, also called Drakkar Records or Drakkar Publishing, is a German record label with its headquarters in Witten. It is a joint venture with Bertelsmann Music Group.

History
Originally Kopec Music Publishing, Drakkar Entertainment was founded in 1986 by Bogdan Kopec. It initially only handled publishing, but in 1986, when Kopec changed the name to "Drakkar Promotion", he also expanded its services to include management, booking, and merchandising. The company later signed German metal bands such as Raven, Running Wild, and Sodom.

In 1992, the company joined forces with Bertelsmann Music Group to become Drakkar Promotion Musikverlag GmbH. At the same time, another company, G.U.N. Records GmbH was created. This second company became so successful that Kopec, who felt overworked, decided to sell his shares to BMG. He then closed the merchandising, booking, and trading departments of Drakkar Promotion and founded "Drakkar Records". His original company became "Drakkar Entertainment GmbH".

Divisions
Drakkar Entertainment now has four divisions:
 Drakkar Classic, a label publishing rock and metal with orchestral accompaniment.
 Drakkar Records, their metal label.
 e-Wave Records, their electronic label.
 Edition Drakkar, their publishing company.

Artists
De/Vision
Dezperadoz
Diablo
Double Experience
Emil Bulls
Eternal Tears of Sorrow (until 2006)
Gothminister
Grantig
Haggard
Jesus on Extasy
Karelia
The Killer Barbies
Kreator (for Endorama)
Letzte Instanz
Lordi
Loudness
Lumsk
Nightwish (until 2004)
Odd Crew
Omega Lithium 
Rebellion
Sahg
SETYØURSAILS
The Sorrow
The Wakes
Twisted Sister
Xandria (until 2011)
Zeraphine

External links
 Official site of Drakkar Entertainment, contains both an English and German version.
 Drakkar archive website run by Drakkar Entertainment, which gives a description of the history of the label listed here. It's mostly in German, but an English version is available.

German record labels
Heavy metal record labels
Electronic music record labels
Record labels established in 1986
1986 establishments in West Germany